The 2013 World Long Distance Mountain Running Championships (or 2013 World Long Distance MR Championships), was the tenth edition of the global Mountain running competition, World Long Distance Mountain Running Championships, organised by the World Mountain Running Association and was held in Szklarska Poreba, Poland on 3 August 2013.

Results

Men individual

Women individual

References

External links
 World Mountain Running Association official web site

World Long Distance Mountain Running Championships
World Long Distance Mountain Running
August 2013 sports events in Europe
2013 in Polish sport